Alani is a name with multiple, unrelated origins from different cultures. It is a Hawaiian name meaning orange. It might be considered a modern English variant of the names Alan or Alanna.  The popularity of the name coincides with the popularity of other names of Hawaiian origin such as Leilani or modern, created names using the fashionable suffix -lani, which means sky or heaven in Hawaiian. Alani or Àlàní is also a Yoruba masculine name in use in Nigeria. One source gives its meaning as peaceful. One source states it means “one we survived to have.”

Popularity
Alani has been among the top one thousand names given to girls in the United States since 2003 and among the top two hundred fifty names for American girls since 2020. The variant spelling Alanni is also in use.

People
Ipoola Alani Akinrinade (born 1939), a retired Nigerian Army military leader
Alani Bankole (born 1941), Nigerian Egba businessman and chieftain from Ogun State.
Alani Fua (born 1992), former American football linebacker

Notes

Given names derived from plants or flowers